John Bradley was a member of the Wisconsin State Assembly.

Biography
Bradley was born on April 29, 1817 in Bantam, Connecticut. In 1844, he moved to Trenton, Dodge County, Wisconsin Territory, where he would work as a farmer. On November 26, 1846, Bradley married Elizabeth Stevens. They would have six children. Bradley moved to Burns, Wisconsin in 1855 and again was a farmer. He died on April 8, 1902.

Political career
Bradley was a member of the Assembly in 1875, 1876, 1879, 1880 and 1881. Previously, he had been elected a town supervisor of Burns in 1861 and 1873. He was a Republican.

References

External links

Politicians from Litchfield, Connecticut
People from Trenton, Dodge County, Wisconsin
People from Burns, Wisconsin
Republican Party members of the Wisconsin State Assembly
Farmers from Wisconsin
1817 births
1902 deaths
Burials in Wisconsin
19th-century American politicians